Louis Gassier (30 April 1820 – 18 December 1871) was a French operatic baritone.

Biography 
Born in Saint-Maximin-la-Sainte-Baume (Var department), Gassier married the Spanish singer . He was hired with his wife in 1855 at Drury Lane in London, where they performed in La sonnambula and Il trovatore.

Gassier died in Havana on 18 December 1871.

References

External links 

1820 births
1871 deaths
People from Var (department)
French operatic baritones
19th-century French male opera singers